Plutarch's Lives of the Noble Greeks and Romans, commonly called Parallel Lives or Plutarch's Lives, is a series of 48 biographies of famous men, arranged in pairs to illuminate their common moral virtues or failings, probably written at the beginning of the second century AD. The surviving Parallel Lives (Greek: Βίοι Παράλληλοι, Bíoi Parállēloi) comprises 23 pairs of biographies, each pair consisting of one Greek and one Roman of similar destiny, such as Alexander the Great and Julius Caesar, or Demosthenes and Cicero. It is a work of considerable importance, not only as a source of information about the individuals described, but also about the times in which they lived.

Motivation
Parallel Lives was Plutarch's second set of biographical works, following the Lives of the Roman Emperors from Augustus to Vitellius. Of these, only the Lives of Galba and Otho survive.

As he explains in the first paragraph of his Life of Alexander, Plutarch was not concerned with writing histories, but with exploring the influence of character, good or bad, on the lives and destinies of famous men. He wished to prove that the more remote past of Greece could show its men of action and achievement as well as the nearer, and therefore more impressive, past of Rome. His interest was primarily ethical, although the Lives has significant historical value as well. The Lives was published by Plutarch late in his life after his return to Chaeronea and, if one may judge from the long lists of authorities given, it must have taken many years to compile.

Contents

The chief manuscripts of the Lives date from the 10th and 11th centuries, and the first printed edition appeared in Rome in 1470. Thomas North's 1579 English translation was an important source-material for Shakespeare. Jacob Tonson printed several editions of the Lives in English in the late 17th century, beginning with a five-volume set printed in 1688, with subsequent editions printed in 1693, 1702, 1716, and 1727. The most generally accepted text is that of the minor edition of Carl Sintenis in the Bibliotheca Teubneriana (five volumes, Leipzig 1852–1855; reissued without much change in 1873–1875). There are annotated editions by I. C. Held, E. H. G. Leopold, Otto Siefert and Friedrich Blass and Carl Sintenis, all in German; and by Holden, in English.

Two of the lives, those of Epaminondas and Scipio Africanus or Scipio Aemilianus, are lost, and many of the remaining lives are truncated, contain obvious lacunae and/or have been tampered with by later writers.

Plutarch's Life of Alexander is one of the few surviving secondary or tertiary sources about Alexander the Great, and it includes anecdotes and descriptions of incidents that appear in no other source. Likewise, his portrait of Numa Pompilius, an early Roman king, contains unique information about the early Roman calendar.  Plutarch has been praised for the liveliness and warmth of his portrayals, and his moral earnestness and enthusiasm, and the Lives have attracted a large circle of readers throughout the ages.

Biographies

Plutarch structured his Lives by pairing lives of famous Greeks with those of famous Romans. After each pair of lives he generally writes out a comparison of the preceding biographies. The table below gives the list of the biographies. Its order follows the one found in the Lamprias Catalogue, the list of Plutarch's works made by his hypothetical son Lamprias. The table also features links to several English translations of Plutarch's Lives available online. In addition to these 48 Parallel Lives, Plutarch wrote an additional four unpaired biographies that although not considered part of Parallel Lives, can be included in the term Plutarch's Lives. The subjects of these four biographies are Artaxerxes, Aratus, Galba, and Otho.

All dates are BC.

Notes
The two-volume edition of Dryden's translation contains the following biographies:
Volume 1.
Theseus, Romulus, Lycurgus, Numa, 
Solon, Publicola, Themistocles, Camillus, Pericles, Fabius, Alcibiades, Coriolaunus
Timeolon, Aemilus Paulus, Pelopidas, Marcellus, Aristides, Cato the elder, Philopemen, Flaminius, Pyrrus, Marius, Lysander, Sulla, Cimon, Lucullus,
Nicias, Crassus.
Volume 2.
Seutouris, Eumenes, Agesilaus, Pompey, Alexander the Great, Julius Caesar, Phocion, Cato the Younger, Agis, Cleomones, Tiberius Graccus and Gaius Graccus, Demosthenes, Cicero, Demetrius, Mark Anthony, Dion, Marcus Brutus, Aratus 	Artaxerxes II, Galba, Otho.

  The Perseus project also contains a biography of Caesar Augustus, in North's translation, but not from Plutarch's Parallel Lives:  P
  Though the majority of the Parallel Lives were written with the Greek hero (or heroes) placed in the first position followed by the Roman hero, there are three sets of Lives where this order is reversed: Aemilius Paulus/Timoleon, Coriolanus/Alcibiades and Sertorius/Eumenes.
  At the time of composing this table there appears some confusion in the internal linking of the Perseus project webpages, responsible for this split in two references.

Reception
Of the biographies in Parallel Lives, that of Antonius has been cited by multiple scholars as one of the masterpieces of the series. In 1895, George Wyndham wrote that the first rank consists of the biographies of Themistocles, Alcibiades, Marius, Cato the Elder, Alexander, Demetrius, Antonius, and Pompey. Peter D'Epiro praised Plutarch's depiction of Alcibiades as "a masterpiece of characterization." Academic Philip A. Stadter singled out Pompey and Caesar as the greatest figures in the Roman biographies. In a review of the 1859 A. H. Clough translation, Plutarch’s depictions of Antony, Coriolanus, Alcibiades, and the Cato the Elder were praised as deeply drawn. The reviewer found the sayings of Themistocles to be “snowy and splendid”, those of Phocion to be “curt and sharp”, and those of Cato “grave and shrewdly humorous”. Carl Rollyson lauded the biography of Caesar as proof Plutarch is “loaded with perception” and stated that no biographer “has surpassed him in summing up the essence of a life – perhaps because no modern biographer has believed so intensely as Plutarch did in ‘the soul of men’.

John Langhorne, D.D. and William Langhorne, A.M.'s English translation, noted that Amiot, Abbe of Bellozane, published a French translation of the work during the reign of Henry II in the year 1558; and from that work it was translated into English, in the time of Elizabeth I. No other translation appeared until that of John Dryden.

Footnotes

References

External links

 University of Chicago English text of Plutarch's Parallel Lives.
 

Works by Plutarch
Ancient Greek culture
Ancient Roman culture
Biographies (books)
Ethics literature
History books about ancient Rome

de:Plutarch#Parallelbiographien